Rubik, the Amazing Cube is a 1983 half-hour Saturday morning animated series based on the puzzle created by Ernő Rubik, produced by Ruby-Spears Enterprises and broadcast as part of The Pac-Man/Rubik, the Amazing Cube Hour block on ABC from September 10 to December 10, 1983 and continued in reruns until September 1, 1984. The Rubik half hour was broadcast in reruns as a standalone series on ABC from May 4 to August 31, 1985.

The program features a magic Rubik's Cube named Rubik who can fly through the air and has other special powers. Rubik can only come alive when he is in a solved state. The voice of Rubik, Ron Palillo, told TV Guide in 1983 that for the role, he spoke very slowly and then technicians sped up the tapes and raised the pitch. Palillo said Rubik's giggle was very different from the trademark laugh of Horshack, his character on the TV series Welcome Back, Kotter, and that it was pretty "for an inanimate object".

Premise
Rubik falls out of the stagecoach of an evil magician, who later becomes the main villain of the series. Rubik helps Carlos, Lisa, and Reynaldo Rodriguez in foiling the magician’s attempts to recover him. Once, Rubik was recovered by a detective who is a relative of the magician, but then decides the children should keep Rubik, fearing that the magician would use him for evil and selfish purposes.

Outside of the evil magician, episodes usually deal with more normal adversaries, such as when Reynaldo runs afoul of a bully who thwarts his efforts to gain a potential girlfriend, while at the same time the bully makes himself appear decent to the girl. Rubik works in secret to expose the bully’s true brutal personality in front of the girl.

For dramatic purposes, Rubik often gets easily fully scrambled (such as by being dropped or grabbed by the family dog, and sometimes scrambles himself) and usually solved quickly by the Rodriguez children, although in stressful circumstances it takes them longer. When scrambled, Rubik can only be heard making low-key gibberish and can sometimes be heard saying, "Help."

In keeping with the Hispanic flavor of the show, the theme song was sung by Puerto Rican boy band Menudo. Featured in the song were Johnny Lozada, Ricky Melendez, Charlie Masso, Ray Reyes and Roy Rossello.

Cast
 Ron Palillo as Rubik
 Michael Bell as Reynaldo Rodriguez
 Jennifer Fajardo as Lisa Rodriguez
 Michael Saucedo as Carlos Rodriguez
 Angela Moya as Marla

Additional voices: Jack DeLeon, Alan Dinehart, Laurie Faso, Takayo Fischer, Bob Holt, Tress MacNeille, Tysun McMullan, Neil Ross, John Stephenson, Janet Waldo, Alan Young

Episodes

References

External links

Episode index at the Big Cartoon DataBase

1983 American television series debuts
1983 American television series endings
1980s American animated television series
American animated television spin-offs
American children's animated fantasy television series
American Broadcasting Company original programming
English-language television shows
Fictional cubes
Hispanic and Latino American television
Rubik's Cube
Television shows based on toys
Television series by Ruby-Spears